Countries belonging to the Commonwealth of Nations typically exchange High Commissioners, rather than ambassadors. Though there are a few technical differences, they are in practice one and the same office. The following persons have served as British High Commissioner to the Federal Republic of Nigeria since the country gained its independence from the United Kingdom on 1 October 1960:

1960–1963: Antony Head, 1st Viscount Head
1964–1967: Sir Francis Cumming-Bruce
1967–1969: Sir David Hunt
1969–1971: Sir Leslie Glass
1971–1974: Sir Cyril Pickard
1974–1976: Sir Martin Le Quesne
1977–1978: Sir Sam Falle
1979–1983: Sir Mervyn Brown
1983–1984: Sir Hamilton Whyte
1984–1986: ''High Commissioner recalled following the Dikko Affair
1986–1988: Sir Martin Ewans
1988–1991: Brian Barder
1991–1994: Christopher MacRae
1994–1997: Thorold Masefield
1997–2001: Sir Graham Burton
2001–2004:  Sir Philip Thomas
2004–2007: Sir Richard Gozney
2007–2011: Robert Dewar
2011–2012: Andrew Lloyd
2012–2015: Sir Andrew Pocock
2015–2018: Paul Arkwright

2018–: Catriona Laing

References

External links
UK and Nigeria, gov.uk

Nigeria
 
United Kingdom High Commissioners
Nigeria and the Commonwealth of Nations
United Kingdom and the Commonwealth of Nations